John McDaniel may refer to:
 John McDaniel (American football)
 John McDaniel (musician)
 John R. McDaniel, businessman and politician in Virginia